Two Tales and Eight Tomorrows is a collection of science fiction stories  by American writer Harry Harrison between 1958 and 1965. It was   published in 1965 by Victor Gollancz Ltd.

Contents
The collection includes:

Introduction by Brian Aldiss
"The Streets of Ashkelon"
"Portrait of the Artist"
"Rescue Operation"
"Captain Bedlam"
"Final Encounter"
"Unto My Manifold Dooms"
"The Pliable Animal"
"Captain Honario Harpplayer, R.N."
"According to His Abilities"
"I Always Do What Teddy Says"

Reception
Dave Pringle reviewed Two Tales and Eight Tomorrows for Imagine magazine, and stated that "These early stories are mostly light and bright, although 'The Streets of Ashkelon' is a memorable alien melodrama on a religious theme."

Reviews
Review by W. T. Webb (1965) in Vector 34
Review by Nik Morton (1984) in Paperback Inferno, Volume 7, Number 4
Review by Andy Sawyer (1987) in Paperback Inferno, #66

References

1965 short story collections
Short story collections by Harry Harrison
Victor Gollancz Ltd books